Geistthal is a former municipality in the district of Voitsberg in the Austrian state of Styria. Since the 2015 Styria municipal structural reform, it is part of the municipality Geistthal-Södingberg.

Geography
Geistthal lies about 40 km west of Graz at the foot of the Glein Alp.

References

Cities and towns in Voitsberg District